ORP Generał Tadeusz Kościuszko, formerly , is one of two  guided-missile frigates in the Polish Navy. She is named for Tadeusz Kościuszko, an American Revolutionary War hero and hero of Poland's struggle for independence.

Generał Tadeusz Kościuszko is homeported in Gdynia Oksywie, and has participated in numerous NATO exercises in the Baltic Sea.

See also

External links

NavySite.de
Polish Navy official site about Perry class (in English)

Ships built in Los Angeles
1979 ships
Oliver Hazard Perry-class frigates of the Polish Navy